David Byrne (born 14 May 1952) is a Scottish-American singer, songwriter, musician, record producer, actor, writer, music theorist, visual artist, and filmmaker. He was a founding member, principal songwriter, lead singer, and guitarist of the American new wave band Talking Heads.

Byrne has released solo recordings and worked with various media including film, photography, opera, fiction, and non-fiction. He has received an Academy Award, a Grammy Award, a Tony Award, and a Golden Globe Award, and he is an inductee to the Rock and Roll Hall of Fame as part of Talking Heads.

Early life
David Byrne was born on 14 May 1952 in Dumbarton, Dunbartonshire, Scotland, the elder of two children born to Tom (from Lambhill, Glasgow) and Emma Byrne. Byrne's father was Catholic and his mother Presbyterian. Two years after his birth, the family moved to Canada, settling in Hamilton, Ontario. The family left Scotland in part because there were few jobs requiring his father's engineering skills and in part because of the tensions in the extended family caused by his parents' mixed marriage. When Byrne was eight or nine years old they moved to the United States, making their home in Arbutus, Maryland. His father worked as an electronics engineer at Westinghouse Electric Corporation. His mother later became a teacher. Byrne stated that he initially grew up speaking with a Scottish accent but adopted an American one in order to fit in at school. He later recalled "I felt like a bit of an outsider. But then I realized the world was made up of people who were all different. But we’re all here."

Before high school, Byrne already knew how to play the guitar, accordion, and violin. He was rejected from his middle school's choir because they said he was "off-key and too withdrawn". From a young age, he had a strong interest in music. His parents say that he would constantly play his phonograph from age three and he learned how to play the harmonica at age five. His father used his electrical engineering skills to modify a reel-to-reel tape recorder so that Byrne could make multitrack recordings.

Career

Early career: 1971–1974

Byrne graduated from Lansdowne High School in southwest Baltimore County. He started his musical career in a high school band called Revelation, then between 1971 and 1972, he was one half of a duo named Bizadi with Marc Kehoe. Their repertoire consisted mostly of songs such as "April Showers", "96 Tears", "Dancing on the Ceiling" and Frank Sinatra songs. Byrne attended the Rhode Island School of Design (during the 1970–71 term) and the Maryland Institute College of Art (during the 1971–72 term) before dropping out. He returned to Providence in 1973 and formed a band called the Artistics with fellow RISD student Chris Frantz. The band dissolved in 1974. Byrne moved to New York City in May that year, and in September of that year, Frantz and his girlfriend Tina Weymouth followed suit. After Byrne and Frantz were unable to find a bass player in New York for nearly two years, Weymouth learned to play the bass guitar. While working day jobs in late 1974, they were contemplating a band.

Talking Heads: 1975–1991

By January 1975, they were practicing and playing together, while still working normal day jobs. They founded the band Talking Heads and had their first gig in June. Byrne quit his day job in May 1976 and the three-piece band signed to Sire Records in November. Byrne was the youngest member of the band. Multi-instrumentalist Jerry Harrison, previously of The Modern Lovers, joined the band in 1977. The band released eight studio albums to great critical acclaim and commercial success.  Four albums achieved gold status (500K sales) and two others were certified double-platinum (2 million in sales).  The Talking Heads were pioneers of the new wave music scene in the late 1970s / early 1980s with popular and creative music videos on the fledgling MTV network.  This success lasted until the band went into hiatus in 1988. Byrne desired to go solo, but it took three years until 1991 to announce that the band was breaking up. The band had a brief reunion for the single "Sax and Violins" in 1991 before dissolving again. The band was inducted into the Rock and Roll Hall of Fame in 2002, where they reunited to play three tracks, including "Psycho Killer" and "Burning Down the House".

Solo album career: 1979–1981, 1989–present
During his time in the band, David Byrne took on outside projects, collaborating with Brian Eno during 1979 and 1981 on the album My Life in the Bush of Ghosts, which attracted considerable critical acclaim due to its early use of analogue sampling and found sounds. Following this record, Byrne focused his attention on Talking Heads. My Life in the Bush of Ghosts was re-released for its 25th anniversary in early 2006, with new bonus tracks. In keeping with the spirit of the original album, stems for two of the songs' component tracks were released under Creative Commons licenses and a remix contest website was launched.

Rei Momo (1989) was the first solo album by Byrne after leaving Talking Heads, and features mainly Afro-Cuban, Afro-Hispanic, and Brazilian song styles, including popular dances such as merengue, son cubano, samba, mambo, cumbia, cha-cha-chá, bomba and charanga. His third solo album, Uh-Oh (1992), featured a brass section and was driven by tracks such as "Girls on My Mind" and "The Cowboy Mambo (Hey Lookit Me Now)". His fourth solo album, titled David Byrne (1994), was a more proper rock record, with Byrne playing most of the instruments on it, leaving percussion for session musicians. "Angels" and "Back in the Box" were the two main singles released from the album. The first one entered the US Modern Rock Tracks chart, reaching No. 24. For his fifth studio effort, the emotional Feelings (1997), Byrne employed a brass orchestra called Black Cat Orchestra. His sixth, Look into the Eyeball (2001), continued the same musical exploration of Feelings, but was compiled of more upbeat tracks, like those found on Uh-Oh.

Grown Backwards (2004), released by Nonesuch Records, used orchestral string arrangements, and includes two operatic arias as well as a rework of X-Press 2 collaboration "Lazy". He also launched a North American and Australian tour with the Tosca Strings. This tour ended with Los Angeles, San Diego and New York shows in August 2005. He  also collaborated with Selena on her 1995 album Dreaming of You with "God's Child (Baila Conmigo)".

Byrne and Eno reunited for his eighth album Everything That Happens Will Happen Today (2008). He assembled a band to tour worldwide for the album for a six-month period from late 2008 through early 2009 on the Songs of David Byrne and Brian Eno Tour.

In 2012 he released a collaborative album with American singer-songwriter St. Vincent called Love This Giant. The album featured  both Byrne and St. Vincent on vocals and guitar, backed by a brass section. To promote the album, both artists travelled throughout North America, Europe, and Australia on the Love This Giant Tour in 2012 and 2013, with each performing pieces from their career in the album’s distinctive brass band style alongside those composed for the album.

In January 2018, Byrne announced his first solo album in 14 years. American Utopia was released in March through Todo Mundo and Nonesuch Records. He also released the album's first single, "Everybody's Coming to My House", which he co-wrote with Eno. The subsequent tour – which showcased songs from American Utopia alongside highlights from his Talking Heads and solo career to date – was described by NME as being perhaps "the most ambitious and impressive live show of all time", blurring the lines "between gig and theatre, poetry and dance".

Work in theatre, film, and television: 1981–present
In 1981, Byrne partnered with choreographer Twyla Tharp, scoring music he wrote that appeared on his album The Catherine Wheel for a ballet with the same name, prominently featuring unusual rhythms and lyrics. Productions of The Catherine Wheel appeared on Broadway that same year.

He was chiefly responsible for the stage design and choreography of the concert film Stop Making Sense (1984).

Byrne wrote the Dirty Dozen Brass Band-inspired score Music for "The Knee Plays", released in 1985, for Robert Wilson's vast five-act opera The Civil Wars: A Tree Is Best Measured When It Is Down.

He wrote, directed, and starred in True Stories (1986), a musical collage of discordant Americana, as well as produced most of the film's music. He was impressed by the experimental theatre that he saw in New York City in the 1970s and collaborated with several of its best-known representatives. He worked with Robert Wilson on "The Knee Plays" and "The Forest", and invited Spalding Gray (of The Wooster Group) to act in True Stories, while Meredith Monk provided a small part of that film's soundtrack. The musician provided a soundtrack for JoAnne Akalaitis' film Dead End Kids (1986), made after a Mabou Mines theatre production. Byrne's artistic outlook has a great deal in common with the work of these artists. The same year he also added "Loco de Amor" with Celia Cruz to Jonathan Demme's film Something Wild (1986).

His work has been extensively used in film soundtracks, most notably in collaboration with Ryuichi Sakamoto and Cong Su on Bernardo Bertolucci's The Last Emperor (1987), which won an Academy Award for Best Original Score.

Some of the music from Byrne's orchestral album The Forest was originally used in a Robert Wilson-directed theatre piece with the same name. The play The Forest premiered at the Theater der Freien Volksbühne, Berlin, in 1988. It received its New York premiere in December 1988 at the Brooklyn Academy of Music (BAM). The Forestry Maxi-single contained dance and industrial remixes of pieces from The Forest by Jack Dangers, Rudy Tambala, and Anthony Capel. Byrne released his soundtrack album in 1991.

Byrne also directed the documentary Île Aiye (1989) and the concert film of his 1992 Latin-tinged tour titled Between the Teeth (1994).

In Spite of Wishing and Wanting is a soundscape Byrne produced in 1999 for Belgian choreographer Wim Vandekeybus's dance company Ultima Vez.

In 2003, Byrne guest starred as himself on a season 14 episode of The Simpsons. Released the same year, Lead Us Not into Temptation included tracks and musical experiments from his score to film Young Adam (2003).

In late 2005, Byrne and Fatboy Slim began work on Here Lies Love, a disco opera or song cycle about the life of Imelda Marcos, the controversial former First Lady of the Philippines. Some music from this piece was debuted at Adelaide Festival of Arts in Australia in February 2006 and the following year at Carnegie Hall on 3 February 2007.

In 2008, Byrne released Big Love: Hymnal – his soundtrack to season two of Big Love, which aired in 2007. These two albums constituted the first releases on his independent record label Todo Mundo. Byrne and Brian Eno provided the soundtrack for the film Wall Street: Money Never Sleeps (2010).

In 2015, he organised Contemporary Color, two arena concerts in Brooklyn and Toronto, for which he brought in ten musical acts who teamed up with ten color guard groups. The concerts were made into a 2016 documentary film, directed by Bill and Turner Ross, and produced by Byrne.

He collaborated with Stanford University professor Mala Gaonkar in 2016 to co-create NEUROSOCIETY, a guided immersive theater performance.

In October 2019, his American Utopia opened at the Hudson Theatre on Broadway. Byrne appeared in comedian John Mulaney's children's musical comedy special John Mulaney & the Sack Lunch Bunch (2019), where he performed the song "Pay Attention!" His song "Tiny Apocalypse" was also featured as the special's end credits song.

On February 29, 2020, after a 30-year absence, Byrne performed as the musical guest on Saturday Night Live with John Mulaney as host. Byrne performed "Once in a Lifetime" and "Toe Jam" with the cast of the Broadway show American Utopia and appears in the "Airport Sushi" sketch singing a parody of "Road to Nowhere". This was Byrne's third appearance on Saturday Night Live. He previously served as the musical guest as part of Talking Heads in 1979, and as a solo musical guest in 1989.

In 2022, Byrne again collaborated with Mala Gaonkar on another immersive theater production based on his life, "Theater of the Mind".

Other musical contributions: 1990–present
Byrne has contributed songs to five AIDS benefit compilation albums produced by the Red Hot Organization: Red Hot + Blue: A Tribute to Cole Porter, Red Hot + Rio, Silencio=Muerte: Red Hot + Latin, Onda Sonora: Red Hot + Lisbon, and Offbeat: A Red Hot Soundtrip. He appeared as a guest vocalist/guitarist for 10,000 Maniacs during their MTV Unplugged concert, though the songs in which he is featured were cut from the following album. One of them, "Let the Mystery Be", appeared as the fourth track on 10,000 Maniacs' CD single "Few and Far Between".

In 1992, he performed with Richard Thompson. Their joint acoustic concert at St. Ann & The Holy Trinity in Brooklyn Heights, New York on 24 March, produced the album An Acoustic Evening which was released the same year. Byrne worked with Latin superstar Selena in March 1995; writing, producing and singing a bilingual duet titled "God's Child (Baila Conmigo)". This became the last song Selena recorded before she was murdered on March 31, 1995. The song was included on the singer's posthumous album Dreaming of You.

In 1997, he was the host of Sessions at West 54th during its second of three seasons and collaborated with members of Devo and Morcheeba to record the album Feelings.

In 2001, a version of Byrne's single "Like Humans Do", edited to remove its marijuana reference, was selected by Microsoft as the sample music for Windows XP to demonstrate Windows Media Player.

In 2002, Byrne co-wrote and provided vocals for a track, "Lazy" by X-Press 2, which reached No. 2 in the United Kingdom and number-one on the US Dance Charts. He said in an interview on BBC Four Sessions coverage of his Union Chapel performance that "Lazy" was number-one in Syria. The track later featured with orchestral arrangements on his Grown Backwards (2004) album.

In September 2004, Byrne co-authored a CD collection and performed with Gilberto Gil at a benefit concert promoting the Creative Commons license.

In 2006, his singing was featured on "The Heart's a Lonely Hunter" on The Cosmic Game by Thievery Corporation.

In 2007, he provided a cover of the Fiery Furnaces' song "Ex-Guru" for a compilation to celebrate the 15th anniversary of the founding of Thrill Jockey, a Chicago-based record label.

In April 2008, Byrne took part in the Paul Simon retrospective concert series at BAM performing "You Can Call Me Al" and "I Know What I Know" from Simon's Graceland album. Later that year, Byrne and his production team turned the Battery Maritime Building, a 99-year-old ferry terminal in Manhattan, into a playable musical instrument. The structure was connected electronically to a pipe organ and made playable for a piece called "Playing the Building". This project was previously installed in Stockholm in 2005, and later at the London Roundhouse in 2009. Byrne says that the point of the project was to allow people to experience art first hand, by creating music with the organ, rather than simply looking at it. Also in 2008, he collaborated with the Brighton Port Authority, composing the music and singing the lyrics for "Toe Jam".

Byrne is featured on the tracks "Money" and "The People Tree", on N.A.S.A.'s 2009 album The Spirit of Apollo. In 2009, he also appeared on HIV/AIDS charity album Dark Was the Night for Red Hot Organization. He collaborated with Dirty Projectors on the song "Knotty Pine". In the same year, Byrne performed at the Bonnaroo Music Festival in Manchester, Tennessee. He also was a signator of a letter protesting the decision of the Toronto International Film Festival to choose Tel Aviv as the subject of its inaugural City-to-City Spotlight strand.

In May 2011, Byrne contributed backing vocals to the Arcade Fire track "Speaking in Tongues" which appeared on the deluxe edition of their 2010 album The Suburbs.

Jherek Bischoff's 2012 album Composed features Byrne on the track "Eyes". The same year, he also released a show recorded with Caetano Veloso in 2004 at New York City's Carnegie Hall (Live at Carnegie Hall).

In March 2013, he debuted a fully staged production of his 2010 concept album Here Lies Love at New York's Public Theater, directed by Tony Award-nominee Alex Timbers following its premiere at MoCA earlier in the year. That same month, he and Sakamoto released a re-recording of their 1994 collaboration "Psychedelic Afternoon" to raise money and awareness for children impacted by the 2011 Tōhoku earthquake and tsunami.

In May 2014, Byrne announced his involvement with Anna Calvi's EP, Strange Weather, collaborating with her on two songs: a cover of Keren Ann's "Strange Weather" and Connan Mockasin's "I'm the Man, That Will Find You".

In August 2016, he was featured on "Snoopies" on the Kickstarter-funded album, And the Anonymous Nobody... by De La Soul.

Other work
David Byrne co-founded the world-music record label Luaka Bop with Yale Evlev in 1990. It was originally created to release Latin American compilations, but it has grown to include music from Cuba, Africa, the Far East and beyond, releasing the work of artists such as Cornershop, Os Mutantes, Los De Abajo, Jim White, Zap Mama, Tom Zé, Los Amigos Invisibles, and King Changó.

In 2005, he initiated his own internet radio station, Radio David Byrne. Each month, Byrne posts a playlist of music he likes, linked by themes or genres. Byrne's playlists have included African popular music, country music classics, vox humana, classical opera and film scores from Italian movies.

He serves on the board of directors of SoundExchange, an organisation designated by the United States Congress to collect and distribute digital performance royalties for sound recordings.

In 2006, Byrne released Arboretum, a sketchbook facsimile of his Tree Drawings, published by McSweeney's. Byrne is a visual artist whose work has been shown in contemporary art galleries and museums around since the 1990s. Represented by the Pace/MacGill Gallery in New York. In 2010 his original artwork was in the exhibition The Record: Contemporary Art and Vinyl at the Nasher Museum of Art at Duke University.

TED Talks
David Byrne has also been a speaker at the TED conferences. In June 2010, he spoke at the TED conference about the effects of architecture on music. Later in October 2010, he performed a hit from Talking Heads's 1988 album Naked titled "(Nothing But) Flowers" along with Thomas Dolby and string quartet Ethel-the TED2010 house band.

Personal life
Although a resident of the United States since childhood, Byrne was a British citizen until 2012, when he became a dual citizen of the United Kingdom and the United States. He lives in New York City. His father, Thomas, died in October 2013. His mother, Emma, died in June 2014. Speaking of his Scottish origins in a 2014 interview with The Evening Standard Byrne stated "I have lived in the States pretty much my whole life, but from my parents and everything, there's still an affinity to maybe a Scottish sense of humour, and some of the attitudes that go with that." During the 2014 Scottish independence referendum, Byrne expressed his preference for a No vote and for Scotland to remain part of the United Kingdom.

Byrne describes himself as on the autism spectrum, but has not been professionally diagnosed. In a 2020 interview on Amy Schumer's podcast 3 Girls, 1 Keith, he stated that he felt that his condition was a superpower as it allows him to hyperfocus on his creative pursuits. In 2012, he stated that he felt that music was his way of communicating when he could not do it face to face because of autism.

Relationships
Byrne had a brief relationship with Toni Basil in 1981 and he dated Twyla Tharp between 1981 and 1982. While visiting Japan in 1982, Byrne met costume designer Adelle Lutz, and they married in 1987. They have a daughter, Malu Abeni Valentine Byrne, born in 1989, and a grandson born in 2018. Malu spoke about one of her middle names, Abeni, in a 2016 interview with Elle: "It is Nigerian, and it means 'We asked for her and she came to us.' My parents had a hard time having kids, and when I finally came along, their good friend offered up this name." Byrne and Lutz divorced in 2004. After his divorce, he became romantically involved with art curator and Gagosian Gallery sales director Louise Neri. He also had a relationship with the artist Cindy Sherman from 2007 to 2011.

Cycling
Byrne is known for his activism in support of increased cycling and for having used a bike as his main means of transport throughout his life, especially cycling around New York. In Los Angeles, Byrne drives a Citroën DS, but in New York, he does not drive a car.

He says that he began cycling while he was in high school and returned to it as an adult in the late 1970s. He likes the freedom and exhilaration cycling gives him. He has written widely on cycling, including a 2009 book, Bicycle Diaries. In August 2009, Byrne auctioned his Montague folding bike to raise money for the London Cycling Campaign.

In 2008, Byrne designed a series of bicycle parking racks in the form of image outlines corresponding to the areas in which they were located, such as a dollar sign for Wall Street and an electric guitar in Williamsburg, Brooklyn. Byrne worked with a manufacturer who constructed the racks in exchange for the right to sell them later as art. The racks remained on the streets for about a year.

Two bike racks with the interchangeable Byrne Bike Rack Alphabet remain installed at the Brooklyn Academy of Music.

Works

Studio albums with Talking Heads

Talking Heads: 77 (1977)
More Songs About Buildings and Food (1978)
Fear of Music (1979)
Remain in Light (1980)
Speaking in Tongues (1983)
Little Creatures (1985)
True Stories (1986)
Naked (1988)

Solo studio albums and collaborations 

 My Life in the Bush of Ghosts (1981) (with Brian Eno)
 Rei Momo (1989)
 Uh-Oh (1992)
 David Byrne (1994)
 Feelings (1997)
 Look into the Eyeball (2001)
 Grown Backwards (2004)
 Everything That Happens Will Happen Today (2008) (with Brian Eno)
 Love This Giant (2012) (with St. Vincent)
 American Utopia (2018)

Soundtracks and music for theater

 "—" denotes albums that were released but did not chart, albums not released in a particular territory, or chart information is not available.

Film and television
Concert films

Other film and television

Competitive awards and nominations

Bibliography
Sources:
 True Stories (1986)
 Preface for Occupied Territory by Lynne Cohen, Aperture Foundation (1987)
 Strange Ritual, Chronicle Books (1995)
 Your Action World (1999)
 The New Sins (Los Nuevos Pecados) (2001)
 David Byrne Asks You: What Is It? Smart Art Press (2002)
 Envisioning Emotional Epistemological Information with DVD (2003)
 Arboretum (2006)
 Bicycle Diaries (2009)
 How Music Works (2012)
  A History of the World (in Dingbats): Drawings & Words (2022)

References

Further reading

External links

 
 
 
 
 
 

 
1952 births
20th-century American guitarists
21st-century American businesspeople
21st-century American non-fiction writers
21st-century American male singers
21st-century American singers
Alternative rock singers
American alternative rock musicians
American bloggers
American dance musicians
American experimental musicians
American film score composers
American male bloggers
American male cyclists
American male film actors
American male guitarists
American male non-fiction writers
American male singer-songwriters
American multi-instrumentalists
American music industry executives
American musical theatre composers
American new wave musicians
American record producers
American rock guitarists
American rock keyboardists
American world music musicians
American writers about music
Atomic Bomb! Band members
Bessie Award winners
Best Original Music Score Academy Award winners
20th-century British guitarists
21st-century British businesspeople
21st-century British non-fiction writers
21st-century British male singers
British alternative rock musicians
British bloggers
British dance musicians
British experimental musicians
British film score composers
British male bloggers
British male cyclists
British male film actors
British male guitarists
British male non-fiction writers
British male singer-songwriters
British multi-instrumentalists
British music industry executives
British musical theatre composers
British new wave musicians
British record producers
British rock guitarists
British rock keyboardists
British world music musicians
British writers about music
Businesspeople from Maryland
Businesspeople from New York City
Creative Commons-licensed authors
Cycling advocates
Experimental pop musicians
Film directors from Maryland
Film directors from New York City
Golden Globe Award-winning musicians
Grammy Award winners
Guitarists from Maryland
Guitarists from New York City
Living people
Luaka Bop artists
Male actors from Maryland
Male actors from New York City
American male film score composers
Male new wave singers
Nonesuch Records artists
People from Arbutus, Maryland
People from Dumbarton
People with acquired American citizenship
Record producers from New York (state)
Rhode Island School of Design alumni
Rhode Island School of Design alumni in music
Rock songwriters
Scottish emigrants to Canada
Scottish emigrants to the United States
Singer-songwriters from Maryland
Singers from New York City
Sire Records artists
Talking Heads members
Thrill Jockey artists
Writers from New York City
20th-century American male singers
20th-century American singers
Singer-songwriters from New York (state)
Cyclists from New York (state)
Warner Records artists